Tetracoccus dioicus, known by the common names  red shrubby-spurge and Parry's tetracoccus, is a species of flowering plant.

Distribution
The shrub native to the states of southwestern California  and Baja California (México).  In Southern California, populations are within Orange County,  Riverside County,  and San Diego County.

Description
It has gray-barked branches that are bright red when young.

The stiff, leathery, yellowish-green leaves are opposite or clustered, often in threes, and they may be rolled lengthwise.

The shrub bears staminate and pistillate flowers with red-yellow structures. The bloom period is April and May.

It produces distinctive four-lobed fruits which ripen to a bright red color.

See also
 California coastal sage and chaparral ecoregion
 California montane chaparral and woodlands ecoregion

References

External links

 Calflora Database: Tetracoccus dioicus (Parry's tetracoccus,  Red shrubby spurge)
Jepson Manual eFlora (TJM2) treatment of Tetracoccus dioicus
UC CalPhotos gallery for Tetracoccus dioicus

Picrodendraceae
Flora of California
Flora of Baja California
Natural history of the California chaparral and woodlands
Natural history of the Peninsular Ranges
Taxa named by Charles Christopher Parry
Flora without expected TNC conservation status